Sydney Edward Wright (3 June 1914 – 7 October 1966) was an Australian academic, pacifist, pharmacist, pharmacy college head and technical/TAFE college teacher. He was born in Waverley, Sydney, New South Wales and died in Drummoyne, Sydney, New South Wales. He attended Sydney Boys High School from 1930 to 1931.

See also

 Edwin John Davidson

References

1914 births
1966 deaths
Academic staff of the University of Queensland
Australian pacifists
Australian pharmacists
Australian people of English descent
Academic staff of the University of Sydney